The Heads may refer to:

Music
The Heads (British band), a stoner rock band
The Heads (New York band), a psychedelic rock band
The Heads, a band made up of former members of Talking Heads

Places
The Heads (Oregon), a cape off the Oregon Coast in the U.S.
Sydney Heads, the entrance to Sydney Harbour in Australia